The Cheltenham Deanery is a Roman Catholic deanery in the Diocese of Clifton that covers several churches in Cheltenham and the surrounding area. It is one of thirteen deaneries in the diocese. The other deaneries are Bath, Bristol East, Bristol North West, Bristol South, Glastonbury, Gloucester, Salisbury, Stroud, Swindon, Taunton, Trowbridge and Weston-super-Mare.

The dean of Cheltenham is centred at the Parish of St Gregory the Great and St Thomas More in Cheltenham.

Churches 
The churches in the deanery include:
 St Gregory the Great, Cheltenham
 St Thomas More, Cheltenham, served from St Gregory the Great
 Sacred Hearts of Jesus and Mary, Charlton Kings, Cheltenham
 St Catharine, Chipping Campden 
 St Benet, Kemerton
 Our Lady and St Kenelm, Stow-on-the-Wold
 St Nicholas, Winchcombe.

Gallery

References

External links
 Diocese of Clifton site
 St Gregory the Great with St Thomas More Parish site
 Sacred Hearts of Jesus and Mary Parish site
 Our Lady and St Kenelm Parish site
 St Nicholas Parish site

Roman Catholic Deaneries in the Diocese of Clifton